Terrance Terlie Taylor (born May 14, 1986) is an American football defensive tackle who is currently a free agent. He was drafted by the Indianapolis Colts in the fourth round of the 2009 NFL Draft. He played college football at Michigan.  In high school, he won the state title in wrestling.

Taylor has also been a member of the Carolina Panthers, Detroit Lions, and Pittsburgh Power.

Professional career

Indianapolis Colts
Taylor was drafted by the Indianapolis Colts in the fourth round (136th overall) of the 2009 NFL Draft. He was waived by the team during final cuts on September 5.

Carolina Panthers
Taylor was signed to the practice squad of the Carolina Panthers on October 14, 2009, only to be released on October 20.

Detroit Lions
Taylor was signed to the practice squad of the Detroit Lions on December 15, 2009. He was released on December 20, only to be re-signed to the practice squad on December 23.

After his contract expired following the 2009 season, the Lions re-signed Taylor to a future contract on January 5, 2010. He was waived on April 26, 2010.

Spokane Shock
Taylor was signed by the Spokane Shock of the Arena Football League on January 20, 2011.

Pittsburgh Power
Taylor was traded to the Pittsburgh Power on May 29, 2011. He made his Power debut on June 11, 2011 against the Tampa Bay Storm.

Spokane Shock (second stint)
Taylor returned to the Spokane Shock for the 2013 season and stayed through to the 2015 season.

Orlando Predators
On March 23, 2016, Taylor was claimed off reassignment by the Orlando Predators.

West Michigan Ironmen
On March 1, 2017, Taylor signed with the West Michigan Ironmen of Champions Indoor Football.

Baltimore Brigade
On May 25, 2017, Taylor was assigned to the Baltimore Brigade.

Columbus Destroyers
On March 6, 2019, Taylor was assigned to the Columbus Destroyers.

References

External links
Carolina Panthers bio
Detroit Lions bio
Indianapolis Colts bio

1986 births
Living people
Sportspeople from Muskegon, Michigan
Players of American football from Michigan
American football defensive tackles
Michigan Wolverines football players
Indianapolis Colts players
Carolina Panthers players
Detroit Lions players
Spokane Shock players
Pittsburgh Power players
Orlando Predators players
West Michigan Ironmen players
Baltimore Brigade players
Columbus Destroyers players